Drug studies may refer to:
 Clinical trials, experiments done to test the safety and effectiveness of medications
 The academic study of psychoactive drugs, chemical substances that alter perception, mood, consciousness or behavior